Charles James Fitzgerald (6 June 1899, in Fairhall – 8 May 1961, in Awatere Valley) was a New Zealand dual-code international rugby footballer who represented New Zealand in rugby union and rugby league. Fitzgerald was a utility back in both codes.

Rugby union career
Fitzgerald represented Marlborough between 1917 and 1921, appearing for the union in every backline position except fullback. He played for a combined Nelson-Marlborough-Golden Bay-Motueka side against the 1921 Springboks kicking a penalty goal in the side's 26–3 defeat. In that game he lined up alongside fellow future dual-international Jim O'Brien.

Fitzgerald played for the South Island in 1922, scoring a try in the inter-island match. Following this he was selected for New Zealand, playing in five matches on a tour of New Zealand and Australia. Fitzgerald represented New Zealand (RU) in the 12–11 victory over Wairarapa at Carterton on 19 July 1922, the 26–19 victory over New South Wales at Sydney on 29 July 1922, the 24–6 victory over Metropolitan Union at Sydney on 2 August 1922, the 6–8 defeat by New South Wales at Sydney on 7 August 1922, and scored a penalty in the 45–11 victory over Manawatu-Wellington XV at Palmerston North on 16 August 1922 but never played a Test match for the New Zealand national rugby union team.

In 1923 Fitzgerald moved to Christchurch, joining the Marist Old Boys club. However the club was expelled from the Canterbury Rugby Union in April 1924 and Fitzgerald followed the club to play rugby league.

Rugby league career
Fitzgerald excelled in rugby league and in his debut year he made the national side, playing in two Test matches against Great Britain. He played for the South Island in 1925.

References

1899 births
1961 deaths
Dual-code rugby internationals
Canterbury rugby league team players
Marlborough rugby union players
New Zealand international rugby union players
New Zealand national rugby league team players
New Zealand rugby league players
New Zealand rugby union players
Sportspeople from the Marlborough Region
Rugby league centres
Rugby union centres
Rugby union fly-halves
Rugby union scrum-halves
Rugby union wings
South Island rugby league team players
South Island rugby union players
Rugby league wingers